CHIME syndrome, also known as Zunich–Kaye syndrome or Zunich neuroectodermal syndrome, is a rare congenital ichthyosis first described in 1983. The acronym CHIME is based on its main symptoms: colobomas, heart defects, ichthyosiform dermatosis, intellectual disability, and either ear defects or epilepsy. It is a congenital syndrome with only a few cases studied and published.

Symptoms and signs
Associated symptoms range from things such as colobomas of the eyes, heart defects, ichthyosiform dermatosis, intellectual disability, and ear abnormalities. Further symptoms that may be suggested include characteristic facies, hearing loss, and cleft palate.

Genetics

CHIME syndrome is considered to have an autosomal recessive inheritance pattern. This means the defective gene is located on an autosome, and two copies of the gene, one from each parent, are required to inherit the disorder. The parents of an individual with autosomal recessive disorder both carry one copy of the defective gene, but usually do not have the disorder.

Diagnosis

Treatment
Treatment with isotretinoin may induce substantial resolution of skin lesions, but the risk of secondary infection remains.

See also 
 List of cutaneous conditions

References

Bibliography

External links 

Autosomal recessive disorders
Rare diseases
Syndromes affecting the eye
Genodermatoses
Genetic disorders with OMIM but no gene
Syndromes affecting the heart
Syndromes with intellectual disability